Utkal Sahitya Samaj (Utkal Literary Society) is a literary organization located in Cuttack, Odisha, India, founded in 1903. The organization is aimed to the debate on Odia literature and to develop people's interest in Odia language.

Historian Prabhat Mukherjee remarks that the establishment of the Utkal Sahitya Samaj "marked the renaissance in Oriya literature".

History
Utkal Sahitya Samaj was established from another organization named Alochana Sabha in May 1903. The main aim of the establishment of Utkal Sahitya Samaj was to arrange debate on Oriya literature and to develop people's interest in Oriya language. Some of its founding members were Madhusudan Rao, Radhanath Ray, Fakir Mohan Senapati, Gopal Chandra Praharaj, and Mrutunjay Rath. Radhanath Ray was appointed as its first president.

Awards
Utkal Sahitya Samaj gives annual award named 'Utkal Ratna' to the author of significant work published in Odia language.

Presidents
 Radhanath Ray
 Ratnakar Chaini
 Kunja Bihari Das

References

External links
 Official website

1903 establishments in India
Arts organizations established in 1903
Indic literature societies